Geonoma irena is a species of palm tree. It is endemic to Ecuador. It grows in coastal forest habitat that is undergoing degradation and deforestation.

References

irena
Endemic flora of Ecuador
Endangered plants
Plants described in 1996
Taxonomy articles created by Polbot